The Discover Screenwriting Award honors writers who had his or her screenplay produced into a feature film or movie for television. The American Screenwriters Association presents these annual award.

Winners and nominees
 2001: Milo Addica – Monster's Ball
 Ted Elliott, Terry Rossio, Roger S. H. Schulman, and Joe Stillman – Shrek
 Julian Fellowes – Gosford Park
 Jean-Pierre Jeunet and Guillaume Laurant – Amélie
 Christopher Nolan – Memento

 2002: Nia Vardalos – My Big Fat Greek Wedding
 David Hare – The Hours
 Ronald Harwood – The Pianist
 Peter Hedges, Chris Weitz, and Paul Weitz – About a Boy
 Alexander Payne and Jim Taylor – About Schmidt

 2003: Antwone Fisher – Antwone Fisher
 Sofia Coppola – Lost in Translation
 Richard Curtis – Love Actually
 Brian Helgeland – Mystic River
 Bob Peterson, David Reynolds, and Andrew Stanton, – Finding Nemo

 2004: Paul Haggis – Million Dollar Baby
 Terry George and Keir Pearson – Hotel Rwanda
 David Magee – Finding Neverland
 Patrick Marber – Closer
 José Rivera – The Motorcycle Diaries

 2005: Dan Futterman – Capote
 George Clooney and Grant Heslov – Good Night, and Good Luck
 Miranda July – Me and You and Everyone We Know
 Angus MacLachlan – Junebug
 Josh Olson – A History of Violence

 2006: Michael Arndt – Little Miss Sunshine
 Russell Gewirtz – Inside Man
 Paul Greengrass – United 93
 Peter Morgan – The Queen
 Jason Reitman – Thank You for Smoking

 2007: Adrienne Shelly – Waitress
 Steven Conrad – The Pursuit of Happyness
 Pierce Gardner and Peter Hedges – Dan in Real Life
 Daniel Giat – Bury My Heart at Wounded Knee
 Nancy Oliver – Lars and the Real Girl

External links 
DISCOVER SCREENWRITING AWARD

American film awards